Rayhana Obermeyer (born November 1, 1963), also known as Rayhana, is an Algerian actress, comedienne and playwright and director.

Biography
Obermeyer was born in Algeria. She moved to France at age 36 in 2000 and began pursuing an acting career there.

Filmography

As actor
 Ce Chemin Devant Moi, 2012.
 Let Them Come, 2015.

As director
 À Mon Âge je me Cache Encore Pour Fumer (I Still Hide To Smoke) 2016.

References

External links
 

1963 births
Living people
Algerian actresses
Algerian women comedians
21st-century Algerian people